Always Afternoon is a 1988 Australian mini series about German internees in Australia, set in 1914 at Trial Bay Gaol in New South Wales. The series was based on a novel by Gwen Kelly and depicts a love story involving an Australian woman and a German violinist. It was a co-production between Germany and Australia.

It inspired a series of paintings by Ross Watson.

References

External links

Always Afternoon at AustLit

Australian television films
1980s Australian television miniseries